The 2008–09 Slovak Superliga (known as the Slovak Corgoň Liga for sponsorship reasons) was the 16th season of first-tier football league in Slovakia, since its establishment in 1993. This season started on 19 July 2008 and ended on 30 May 2009. FC Artmedia Petržalka were the defending champions.

Teams

Promotion and relegation
FK AS Trenčín were relegated after concluding the last season in 12th and last place. They were replaced by the champions of the 2007–08 1. Liga, 1. FC Tatran Prešov. Also DAC Dunajská Streda, who were Western Group champions of the 2007–08 2. Liga, merged with FC Senec and took their place in Superliga.

Stadiums and locations

League table

Results
The schedule consists of three rounds. The pairings of the first round were set according to the 2007-08 final standings. Every team played each opponent once for a total of 11 games per team. The remaining two rounds consist of a conventional home and away round-robin schedule.

First round
Key numbers for pairing determination (number marks position in final standings 2007-08):

Second and third round

Top scorers
Source:

See also
2008–09 Slovak Cup
2008–09 Slovak First League

External links
 Slovak FA official site 
 slovakfootball.com

Slovak
Slovak Super Liga seasons
1